The Hispano-Suiza 12Y was an aircraft engine produced by Hispano-Suiza for the French Air Force before the Second World War. The 12Y became the primary French 1,000 hp (750 kW) class engine and was used in a number of famous aircraft, including the Morane-Saulnier M.S.406 and Dewoitine D.520.

Its design was based on the earlier, and somewhat smaller, 12X. The 12X did not see widespread use before the 12Y replaced it and became one of the most powerful French designs on the eve of the war. The 12Z was being designed but this was ended by the fall of France and the German occupation.

The 12Y was produced under Hispano-Suiza licence in the Soviet Union as the Klimov M-100. This design led to the highly successful Klimov VK-105 series that powered the Yakovlev and Lavochkin fighters as well as the Petlyakov Pe-2 bomber. Licensed production of the early models was also undertaken in Czechoslovakia as the Avia HS 12Ydrs and in Switzerland as the HS-77.

Design and development

Early development
The 12Y was a fairly traditional in construction, a 36-litre water-cooled V-12 with the two cast aluminium cylinder banks set at 60 degrees to each other. The cylinder heads were not removable, instead both cylinder banks could be quickly removed from the crankcase section of the engine. This made it somewhat famous for being leak-proof, a design feature that was considered by other designers and almost became a part of the Rolls-Royce Merlin.

The major design change from the earlier 12X was to use a master-articulated connecting rod system, instead of the fork-and-blade type. A single overhead camshaft (SOHC) drove the valves, which were filled with liquid sodium for cooling. Only a single intake and exhaust valve were used, unlike most designs of the era which had moved to three or four valves per cylinder. A single-stage, single-speed supercharger was standard, although the art of designing a useful intake was not as well developed as in other countries, and high altitude performance was always lacking.

The first 12Y test articles were constructed in 1932, and almost immediately the entire French aviation industry began designing aeroplanes based on it. At the time the engine developed only 760 hp (570 kW), but it was clear it had potential to the 1,000 hp (750 kW) class. An early modification led to the Hispano-Suiza 12Ycrs which used a hollow propeller shaft to allow a 20 mm cannon to fire through the propeller spinner (a combination known as a moteur-canon). All later versions shared this feature. The 12Ydrs was the next major series, with a basic rating of 836 hp (623 kW) at sea level with a compression ratio of 5.8:1.

The Armée de l'Air changed their nomenclature, so the next version was the Hispano-Suiza 12Y-21, which increased the compression ratio to 7:1, when running on 100 octane gasoline. This boosted power to 867 hp (647  kW). In 1936 the connecting rod design was changed slightly to create the 12Y-31, but the lower 5.8:1 compression ratio was retained and the power was increased only slightly over the drs model to 850 hp (630 kW). Nevertheless, this became one of the most used engine designs of the pre-war era, used in almost all French fighter designs and prototypes.

Late variants
A real effort to improve the performance of the engine in 1938 resulted in the Hispano-Suiza 12Y-45, which used the S-39-H3 supercharger co-designed by André Planiol and Polish engineer Joseph Szydlowski. The Szydlowski-Planiol device was larger, but much more efficient than the mediocre Hispano-Suiza models. When used with 100 octane fuel, the supercharger boosted to the -21's 7:1, increasing power to 900 hp (670 kW). Combined with the Ratier constant-speed propeller, this allowed the D.520 to perform as well as contemporary designs from Germany and England.

Another improvement in supercharging led to the Hispano-Suiza 12Y-49, whose performance improved from 850 hp (630 kW) at sea level to 920 hp (690 kW) at just over 10,000 ft (3,000 m). This improvement in power with altitude was a common feature of most engines of the era, the result of the supercharger "robbing" power at low altitudes while not boosting the power due to the possibility of detonation.

The final major version was the 1,085 hp (809 kW) Hispano-Suiza 12Y-51, which had just started into production at the time of the Armistice with Germany. The -51 was the first version that came close to the performance limits of the engine, although the single-stage supercharging meant that it was unable to compete with designs from England and Germany above 15,000 ft (5,000 m).

Foreign derivatives
In the early 1930s the Czechoslovakian Republic gained rights to build a license version of the HS-12Y. This was produced by Avia (Škoda) at Prag - Čakovice. The engine was intended to become the standard powerplant of all Czech military aircraft. Both the HS-12Ycrs and HS-12Ydrs were built in quantity and were more commonly known by these names rather than any Czech designation. Aircraft powered by these engines included the Czech Avia B-34, Avia B-534, Avia B-71, Avia B-35, Avia B-135 and the Yugoslav Rogožarski IK-3 .

Switzerland license built and assembled several different versions of the basic 12Ycrs for use in several aircraft: the reconnaissance biplane the EKW C-35, the multipurpose EKW C-36, the Swiss assembled D-3800 copy of the French M.S. 406 fighter and Swiss built versions of the French M.S.412 fighter called the D.3801. Saurer developed the engine further after the Fall of France into the YS-2 and YS-3 engines.  These were used in more powerful follow-on versions of the same basic French fighter design, the M.S.450 called the D.3802 and then the final version called the D.3803.

In the mid-1930s, Russian engineer Vladimir Klimov was sent to France to obtain a license for local production of the 12Y. A series of design changes were added to cope with cold weather operation, and the engine entered production in 1935 as the Klimov M-100 with about 750 hp (560 kW). However a series of continual upgrades increased the allowable RPM from the 12Y's fairly low 2,400 to 2,700, thereby increasing power to 1,100 hp (820 kW). The resulting design, the Klimov M-105 (VK-105) became one of the major Soviet engine designs during the war, powering all Yakovlev fighters.

Variants
Tabulated data from Lage 2004

Related
Hispano-Suiza 12Z

Licence built variants

Czechoslovakia
 Avia HS 12Y

USSR
Klimov VK-100
Klimov VK-103 
Klimov VK-103A  at 
Klimov VK-104
Klimov VK-105P  at take-off
Klimov VK-106  at take-off
Klimov VK-107  at take-off

Switzerland
Hispano-Suiza HS-77
12 Ycrs

Applications

Klimov powered

Specifications (12Y-50)

See also

References

Notes

Bibliography

 Danel, Raymond and Jean Cuny. Docavia n°4: le Dewoitine D.520 (in French). Paris: Editions Larivière, 1966.
 Kotelnikov, Vladimir. Russian Piston Aero Engines. Marlborough, Wiltshire. The Crowood Press Ltd. 2005. .
 Hispano-Suiza 12Y-47 Retrieved: 1 October 2010.
 Wilkinson, Paul H. Aircraft Engines of the World 1945. Paul H. Wilkinson. New York. 1945 
 Gunston, Bill. World Encyclopedia of Aero engines fully revised second edition. Patrick Stephens Limited. Wellingborough. 1989. 
 

1930s aircraft piston engines
M-100
Hispano-Suiza aircraft engines
V12 aircraft engines